Canklow Engine Shed was a traction maintenance depot located in Canklow, Rotherham, England. The depot area had six lines; three of these fed into just one line that went through the shed, whilst the other three were sidings, one of which had the coal stage. 

The shed closed in 1965 and was later demolished with a housing estate erected on the site in 1990.

History 
From 1963 to 1967, Class 25, 37 and 46 locomotives could be seen at the depot.

See also
List of British Railways shed codes

References 

Railway depots in Yorkshire